Kenny Kunene (born 21 October 1970) is a South African ex-convict, born in Zimbabwe to a farmer and seamstress. A businessman and former Secretary-General of the Patriotic Alliance. While working as a high school English teacher, Kunene opened a shebeen selling alcohol after work and began engaging in criminal activities including robberies and fraud. In 1997, he was convicted of running a Ponzi scheme for which he served six years in prison.

After his prison stint, Kunene became a motivational speaker and became active in local politics. He later opened a club called ZAR and became known for throwing lavish parties. In 2011, he drew controversy for hosting “sushi parties” where guest ate sushi off the bodies of half naked women. In February 2019, Kunene released Yookoo Rides, a mobile app for vehicle for hire services.

Early life
Kenny Kunene was raised by his mother and grandparents. Kunene's mother has served as an Evangelist and faith healer. While he was growing up near Odendaalsrus his grandmother, a midwife, was the family's sole breadwinner. Kunene got involved in student politics in the 1980s and at the age of 15 he was imprisoned for 6 months due to his role in student uprising and protests in the Free State.

Career
Kunene attended Marobe Primary School, Rearabetswe Secondary school and Vista University. He later became an English and History teacher. Kunene was imprisoned from 1997 to 2003 after being convicted of running a ponzi scheme. While in prison, he organised parties to build goodwill among his fellow inmates and was influential in prison. After he was released he went to work at Calculus Private School in Bloemfontein and later began working with convicted bank robber Gayton McKenzie who had since become a motivational speaker. Kunene and McKenzie then invested in a seafood distribution business.

Kunene has also worked as a public relations consultant and lobbyist for mining companies. In March 2012 the Hawks (special police investigative unit) spokesman McIntosh Polela confirmed that the Hawks have done an investigation into Kunene regarding fraudulent representations to communities and potential shareholders as part of the application for mining rights by Central Rand Gold (CRG). No charges were levelled.

Kunene was a supporter of the African National Congress until 2013 when he wrote a scathing open letter to President Jacob Zuma criticising his leadership. In July 2013, Kunene briefly joined the Economic Freedom Fighters as a high-profile member of the organisation's "Central Command Team" before resigning from the organisation in August 2013.

In November 2013, Kunene became the Secretary-General of a newly formed political party, the Patriotic Alliance. He left the party in 2014 after the national and provincial elections. Kunene is currently focusing on his businesses including a Smart City Technology Company which has YooKoo Ride an e-hailing Taxi App in South Africa, Public Relations, Government Relations, Skills Training and Development and Mining consulting and Investment.

Personal life
Kunene has five children Mpho, Thato, Mosa, Remo and Reemona and he currently lives with three of his children and his wife MaRemo in Sandton, Johannesburg. Kunene is the third child of four children, his late sister Disebo is the first born, then comes Papiki and last born Neo.

Kunene is known for his appreciation of sushi, and has been referred to in South Africa as "The Sushi King" or "Mr. Sushi". His birthday party on 21 October 2010 that hosted the then ANCYL president Julius Malema and featured nyotaimori was criticised by COSATU secretary general Zwelinzima Vavi, leading to a political row. Also, the ANCWL condemned nyotaimori at Kunene's party as an attack on the bodily integrity and dignity of women in South Africa.

In media
Kunene was the star of South African reality television show So What: Big Money, Big Dreams which aired on e.tv during 2011. In 2013, he appeared in the fourth episode of the British travel documentary television series The Moaning of Life. In April 2014, Kunene was the Roastee of Comedy Central Africa's Roast of Kenny Kunene. Kunene also owns two online news publications namely WeeklyXpose and AfricaNews 24-7.

References

1970 births
Living people
Economic Freedom Fighters politicians
Patriotic Alliance (South Africa) politicians
People from Lejweleputswa District Municipality
South African bank robbers
South African businesspeople
South African politicians convicted of fraud